The Satah Mountain volcanic field (SMVF) is an extensive north-south trending volcanic chain in the Central Interior of British Columbia that stretches south of the Itcha Range shield volcano to northeast of Nimpo Lake. The chain is located on the Chilcotin Plateau, a major subdivision of the Interior Plateau that includes other nearby volcanic features. It forms a segment of the east-west trending Anahim Volcanic Belt, whose volcanic activity ranges in age from Miocene-to-Holocene.

Geology
Volcanic features in the Satah Mountain field include lava domes, cinder cones and lava flows. Lava domes and flows are composed of trachyte and the cinder cones consist of basaltic and trachybasaltic lava. The most recently formed cone is well preserved and might have a similar age to the 7,200‑year‑old Nazko Cone at the easternmost end of the Anahim Volcanic Belt. However, argon-argon dating by Kuehn et al. (2015) found that the youngest SMVF feature was a 1.43 million year old plug of basaltic trachyandesite.

Volcanic features
All features listed in this table were derived from Kuehn et al. (2015) except where noted.

See also
List of volcanoes in Canada
Geology of British Columbia
Anahim hotspot

References

Volcanic fields of Canada
Pleistocene volcanism
Anahim Volcanic Belt
Landforms of the Chilcotin
Volcanoes of British Columbia